Hamer may refer to:                                   

People with the surname Hamer:
Hamer (surname)

In places:
 Hamer, woreda in Ethiopia
 Hamer, Iran
 Hamer, Idaho, United States
 Hamer, Ohio, United States
 Hamer, South Carolina, United States

Other:
 Hamar people, who live in Ethiopia
 Hamer language, language of the Hamer people
 Hamer Guitars, American manufacturing company of electric guitars
 Hamer v. Sidway, a noted 1891 New York court case

See also
Hamer Hall (disambiguation)
Hamer House (disambiguation)